Alexis Gotay Pérez (born June 22, 1985) known artistically as Gotay, is an American singer and songwriter from Puerto Rico. He was born in Brooklyn to a Puerto Rican family, and eventually moved with them to the city of Bayamón, Puerto Rico. Their album "El Del Vibrato" and its subject "Real Love" He held the No. 1 position on several charts in Latin America, came to the top of many radio stations in the United States and Puerto Rico, and was in the top 20 of the Billboard Latin Rhythm of the magazine. Gotay publishes with the record company Autentik Music.

Discography

Studio albums
 2013: El Del Vibrato
 2017: El Chamaquito De Ahora
 2020: Autentik

Mixtapes
 2011: El Concepto
 2012: Imperio Nazza: Gotay Edition

References

External links 
 
 

1985 births
Living people
People from Bayamón, Puerto Rico
Puerto Rican singer-songwriters
Puerto Rican reggaeton musicians
Singers from New York City
Spanish-language singers of the United States
21st-century American singers
Singer-songwriters from New York (state)